Ko Yad is a 2012 Mising drama film, written, directed and produced by Manju Borah. The movie is based on Anil Panging's novel Ko: Yad, published in the weekly Assamese Xadin. The film portrays the life of ordinary Mishing people through the protagonist, Poukam, struggle to make a living, in a small village by the Brahmaputra, in Assam.

At the 60th National Film Award for 2012, the film won the awards for Best Mising Film, and Best Cinematography Award.

Background
The Poukam is a school dropout, who makes a living collecting driftwood from the river Brahmaputra in a boat that he inherited from his father. He faces many difficulties in life. His father collects wood from the river. The movie picturizes Poukam's life, starting from his youth to his old age. But hardworking Poukam, was always put into trouble by his own friends, loan-givers and his son. At last, even the river betrayed him.

Cast
Xewan Xing Yein
Mahika Sharma
Torulota Kutum
Diganta Panging

Production
The film was shot for 25 days starting from 4 July 2012 at the tourist destination of Disangmukh in Assam. The co-directors are- Lohit Dutta, Phul Dauka, Ghanashyam Kalita, Rupam Chetiya and Dibakar Pegu. The film was edited by A. Sreekar Prasad, and music direction is by Isaac Thomas Kottukapally. The film is created in 35mm cinemascope using Dolby Sound technology, under the banner of AAAS Production. Costumes were designed by Jiban Dauka.

Release and reception
Ko: Yad has been praised a lot. At the Bengaluru International Film Festival's Chitrabharati section, judge S.K. Bhagawan has said, "Ko: Yad has presented little described story of Mising villagers very well".

Display and honors
 Best director's award, Ladakh International Film Festival.
 Good film honor, The Indian Films Competition Jury. Best film award, Bengaluru International Film Festival, 2–26 December 2013.
 Shown on15th Mumbai Film Festival
 Best Mising Film, 60th National Film Awards, 2012 
 Best Cinematography Award, 60th National Film Awards.

References

External links
 
 Ko: Yad trailer in Youtube

2012 films
Indian drama films
Films based on Indian novels
Films shot in Assam
Cinema of Assam
Films set in Assam
Northeast Indian films
Non-Assamese-language films with Assamese connection
Films whose cinematographer won the Best Cinematography National Film Award
Films directed by Manju Borah
Best Mising Film National Film Award winners